Testo SE & Co. KGaA is a company from Lenzkirch, founded in 1957, with its headquarters in Titisee-Neustadt.

The company has 35 subsidiary firms in China, Japan, Korea, USA, France, Spain, Italy, and other countries and employs around 3200 people. 1700 alone at its sites in Lenzkirch, Kirchzarten, and Titisee. The company's headquarters were moved from Lenzkirch to Titisee at the end of 2019.

Testo first made 200 million € worth of business in 2011 and had incoming orders worth 208 million €. The company invests about 10% of its annual income into research and development. In 2018, the company first gained an income of over 300 million €.

Testo is a member of the Industrial Companies Trading Association Baden.

History

Legal Development 
The company Testo SE & Co. KGaA as it exists today was founded as Department of Thermometer Development in a branch factory of the Atmos Fritsching & Co. GmbH Viernheim in Lenzkirch in 1957. In the same year, Hans Bauer, founder of this branch, developed an electronic thermometer with an analogue display for measuring fever. The device's measuring range was expanded shortly after, so that it could measure temperatures outside the range of body temperature. Therefore, it was sold as seconds thermometer for industrial and research purposes. The companies product range kept developing steadily but departed over time from the medical products Atmos produced. This is why all members of the  Electronic Measuring Devices department started working for a new company called Testoterm KG Fritzsching, Viernheim, Betrieb Lenzkirch on the 1. of April, 1981.

In 1984, the Atmos Fritzsching & Co. GmbH Betrieb Elektronischer Messgeräte was changed to Testoterm Messtechnik GmbH & Co. KG, which, from that point on, was responsible for development and production. The distributorship kept working as Testoterm Fritzsching GmbH & Co. KG. The two companies merged into Testoterm Fritzsching GmbH & Co. at the 1. of January 1993. The new CEOs were Gerd Knospe, Wolfgang Hessler, and Peter Greiser. Since, at this point in time, the range of produced products exceeded the measuring of temperature the coda term was not up-to-date anymore. This is why the company changed its name to Testo GmbH & Co. KG in July 1993.

In 1999, Testo took over 75% of the Atmos Medizin Technik GmbH & Co. KG, which was its former parent company.

In 2005, the CEOs of Atmos paid off their shareholder Testo.

Six years later, the Testo Sensor GmbH was founded. It develops, produces, and sells thermometers which are implanted into heating systems and solar equipment, in coffee machines and air-conditioning in cars, among others. In 2011, the Testo AG offered their extended management 5% of their shares. This parcel of shares was then signed over.

In the summer of 2016, the company's legal form changed from Testo AG to Testo SE & Co. KGaA.

The construction of a second office building, which is set to look like the first one, in Titisee started in March 2017.

History of Headquarters 

Atmos' department of thermometer development was first located on the top floor of the former school in Unterlenzkirch. The company moved into a villa formerly owned by the clock factory of Lenzkirch. Connected to this building directly, on the area of the old train station of Lenzkirch, new production plants and buildings for administration were constructed in 1971, 1975, 1978, 1982, 1990, 2001, and 2007, creating space for about 800 employees. This number of employees exceeded whatever space there was left in Lenzkirch, which is why Testo started building the first of four Buildings in Titisee in early 2010. Since the beginning of 2012, 250 people are working there. The second phase of construction was planned for 2017/2018, so that the location in Titisee could offer space for up to 1200 employees. When Testo finished the construction of the second building, the company moved its headquarters to Titisee but the location in Lenzkirch still remaines.

Products 

The company offers measuring devices for refrigeration-, air-conditioning-, and environmental technology, for emission- and flue gas analysis, as well as for measuring interior air- and food quality. The most innovative products are a measuring device for fine dust, a measuring device for frier oil, thermographic cameras, a cloud-based monitoring system for measured data, measuring solutions like the HACCP management system and devices which can be controlled via smartphone, like the Smart Probes.

Controversies 
In March 2016, the union IG Metall accused Testo of preventing the foundation of an employee representative committee for several years. All initiatives by the employees and the union were torpedoed by the management, which said that a secret vote had shown that the employees were not interested in having a representative committee. Management was accused of secretly pressuring employees and preventing the union from effectively informing them. Management started to advertise a different system, a professional staff committee, instead.

In early 2017, a case of fraud within the company was made public. A longtime employee was accused of embezzlement of 1.5 million € between 2008 and 2015 by exploiting the company's voucher system. Testo pressed charges against her.

Awards 
 In 2007, the company was honoured as a location of the initiative "Deutschland - Land der Ideen".
 Top-100-seal of quality as one of the most innovative enterprises in Germany (2009).
 Deloitte's Axia Award (2010).
 One of the 50 most innovative medium-sized companies in Germany, honoured by Munich Strategy Group (2014).
 German Design Award in the workshop & tools category for Testo's thermographic camera "testo 870" (2016).
 Top-100-seal of quality as one of the most innovative enterprises in Germany (2018).

References 

1957 establishments in Germany
German companies established in 1957